Cyclanthera is a genus of flowering plants in the family Cucurbitaceae. The name comes from the fact that some species show extreme cases of stamen fusion forming a ring around the gynoecium, with a single locule.

References

 Schaefer, H. & Renner, S.S. (2011) Phylogenetic relationships in the order Cucurbitales and a new classification of the gourd family (Cucurbitaceae), Taxon, 60 (1): 122–138.
 Kearns, D.M. & Jones, E. (1992) A re-evaluation of the genus Cremastopus (Cucurbitaceae). Madroño 39: 301-303.
 Lira Saade, R. (1995) Estudios taxonómicos y ecogeográficos de las Cucurbitaceae latinoamericanas de importancia económica. Rome: IPGRI.

External links
 
 

 
Cucurbitaceae genera